Milkilu, and more properly Milk-ilu, or Milku-ilu, with an alternate version of Ili-Milku (letter 286, by Abdi-Heba of Jerusalem), was the mayor/ruler of Gazru (Gezer) of the 1350–1335 BC Amarna letters correspondence. Adda-danu, and Yapahu were also mayors of Gazru.

Milk-ilu is the author of 5 Amarna letters to the pharaoh of Egypt, EA 267–271, (EA for 'el Amarna'). One letter (EA 369) from the pharaoh to Milk-ilu is known.

EA 369, to Milkilu: "From the Pharaoh to a vassal"
"To Milkilu, the ruler of Gazru: Thus the king. He herewith dispatches to you this tablet (i.e., tablet-letter), saying to you, He herewith sends to you Hanya, the stable (overseer) of the archers, along with everything for the acquisition of beautiful female cupbearers: silver, gold, linen garments: ma-al-ba-ši, carnelian, all sorts of (precious) stones, an ebony chair; all alike, fine things. Total (value): 160 diban. Total: 40 female cupbearers, 40 (shekels of) silver being the price of a female cupbearer. Send extremely beautiful female cupbearers in whom there is no defect (i.e., no guile in their heart), so the king, your lord, will say to you, "this is excellent, in accordance with the order he sent to you." And know that the king is hale like the Sun. For his troops, his ch[ariot]s, his horses, all goes very well. Aman has indeed put the Upper Land, the Lower Land, where the sun rises, where the sun sets, under the feet of the king." —EA 369, lines 1–32 (complete)

Two examples of Milkilu's letters

EA 267, title: "Safe and sound"
"[Sa]y [t]o the king, my lord, my [g]od, my Sun: Message of Milkilu, your servant, the dirt at your feet. I fall at the feet of the king, my lord, my god, my Sun, 7 times and 7 times. The order the king, my lord, my god, my Sun, dispatched to me—I am indeed carrying out for the king, my lord, the Sun from the sky. May the king, my lord, my god, my Sun, know that the place of the king, my lord where I am is safe and sound." —EA 267, lines 1–20 (complete)

EA 268, title: "A consignment of personnel"
"Say [to] the ki[n]g, my [l]ord, [m]y g[o]d, my [S]un: Message of Milkilu, your servant, the [d]i[r]t at your feet. I fall at the feet of the king, my lord, my god, my Sun, 7 times and 7 times. May the k[ing], my [lor]d, know that [the city of the king, my lord], that [he put] i[n my] ch[arge], is safe and sound, [and] the word ... [...] [I sen]d [in the care o]f Hay[a]  46 female ... [...] and 5 male ... [...] and 5 ašīrūma to the king, my lord." —EA 268, lines 1–20, (complete, but with lacunae)

Letter no. 3 of 5: title: "Archers and myrrh"
EA 269 – see: Pítati

Letter no. 4, and no. 5
See Yanhamu for:
No. 4 of 5, Title—"Extortion"
No. 5 of 5, Title—"The power of the 'Apiru"

List of Milkilu's letters
Letter no. 1 of 5—EA 267, title: "Safe and Sound"
Letter no. 2 of 5—EA 268, title: "A Consignment of Personnel"
Letter no. 3 of 5—EA 269, title: "Archers and Myrrh"
Letter no. 4 of 5—EA 270, title: "Extortion"
Letter no. 5 of 5—EA 271, title: "The Power of the 'Apiru"
From the Ancient Egyptian pharaoh:
Letter no. 1 of 1—EA 369, title: "From the Pharaoh to a Vassal"

See also
Yapahu, Gazru mayor
Adda-danu, Gazru mayor
Amarna letters
Endaruta, note on phrasing: "The king is Hale like the Sun, etc."

References
Moran, William L. The Amarna Letters. Johns Hopkins University Press, 1987, 1992. (softcover)

External links 
Letter pictures:
EA 369-Front/Back-(Click on it)-to Enlarge Sides
Discussions/Translations:
EA 369: British Museum-('Totally' varied translation(?)): EA 369, British Museum; Other translation at/ Brit. Mus.

Amarna letters (photos)

King of Babylon: 
EA 9 (Obverse); see: Karaduniyaš

Tushratta:
EA 19 (Obverse), Article, Tushratta
EA 23 (Reverse), with Black Hieratic; Article – (British Museum); see: Shaushka
EA 28 (Obverse), see: Pirissi and Tulubri
"Alashiya kingdom" letters
EA 34 (Obverse); see: EA 34
Rib-Hadda letters:
EA 126 (Obverse); Article-(Click for larger Picture); See: Salhi (region)
Abimilku:
#1: EA 153 (Obverse); Article
#2: EA 153 (Obverse) 2nd; see: Abimilku

Abdi-Tirši:
EA 228 (Obverse)//(228,330,299,245,252), (EA 330, for Šipti-Ba'lu); Article, Pic writeup

Biridiya:
EA 245 (Obverse) EA 245 (Reverse); Article 1; Article 2; Hannathon/Hinnatuna

Labaya:
EA 252 (Obverse), Article, see Labaya

Others:
EA 299-(High Res.)(Obverse); see Yapahu
EA 369-Front/Back-(Click on each); see: Milkilu

Amarna letters writers
Canaanite people
14th-century BC rulers
14th-century BC people